Jaak De Boever (born 29 August 1937) is a Belgian former professional racing cyclist. He won the 1968 E3 Harelbeke.

Major results

1961
 1st Tielt–Antwerpen–Tielt
 1st Omloop der Zuid-West-Vlaamse Bergen
1962
 1st Tielt–Antwerpen–Tielt
 1st Stadsprijs Geraardsbergen
1963
 2nd Omloop van het Leiedal
 2nd Ronde van Oost-Vlaanderen
 2nd Antwerpen - Ougrée
1964
 1st Tielt–Antwerpen–Tielt
 1st Omloop van Midden-Vlaanderen
 1st Stage 2b Dwars door Vlaanderen
 3rd Circuit des Frontières
1965
 1st Stadsprijs Geraardsbergen
1st 
 1st Stage 2b Tour du Nord
 2nd Tielt–Antwerpen–Tielt
 2nd Omloop van het Houtland
1966
1st 
 1st Tielt–Antwerpen–Tielt
 1st Nokere Koerse
 3rd Overall Tour du Nord
 3rd Omloop Mandel-Leie-Schelde
 3rd Grote Prijs Marcel Kint
 6th Grand Prix Cerami
1967
 1st GP Stad Vilvoorde
 2nd Nokere Koerse
 3rd Ronde van Oost-Vlaanderen
 5th Overall Paris–Nice
 8th Gent–Wevelgem
1968
 1st 1968 E3 Harelbeke
 2nd Stadsprijs Geraardsbergen
 10th Gent–Wevelgem
1969
 1st Stage 1b Critérium du Dauphiné Libéré
 1st Stage 4 Four Days of Dunkirk
 1st Circuit de la Région Linière
 2nd Omloop van Centraal-Vlaanderen
 3rd De Kustpijl
1970
 1st Stage 5a Critérium du Dauphiné Libéré
 2nd Grote Prijs Marcel Kint
1972
 3rd Omloop van het Houtland
 3rd GP Stad Vilvoorde

Source:

References

External links

1937 births
Living people
Belgian male cyclists
Cyclists from East Flanders
People from Deinze